The Venezuelan SuperLiga Grand Final MVP is an annual award that is handed out to the most valuable player in the Grand Final series of a given season of the Venezuelan SuperLiga season, the highest professional basketball league in Venezuela.

Winners

References

Liga Profesional de Baloncesto
Venezuelan awards